The 2021–22 National Basketball League (Bulgaria) season is the 81st season of the Bulgarian NBL.

Teams

Regular season
In the regular season, teams play against each other three times home-and-away in a double round-robin format. The draw for the first 18 rounds, was made on 10 September and was show in the NBL youtube channel. The season will start on 9 October. The top eight teams advance to the playoffs.

League table
</onlyinclude>

Results

Playoffs

Bracket

Player of the round

Bulgarian clubs in European competitions

NBL clubs in regional competitions

References

National Basketball League (Bulgaria) seasons
Bulgarian